Cars is a 2006 adventure racing game published by THQ. The game is based on the 2006 film of the same name. It was released for the PlayStation 2, GameCube, Xbox, Microsoft Windows, Game Boy Advance, Nintendo DS, and PlayStation Portable in June 2006, with versions for the Xbox 360 and Wii released later that year. The Wii version includes functionality geared towards its Wii Remote controller and was a launch game for the system.

Taking place after the events of the film, the player controls the protagonist Lightning McQueen as he participates in the new racing season with the end goal of winning the Piston Cup for the first time in his career, while also racing and training with the local community of Radiator Springs. In the PSP version, the player again controls Lightning McQueen. After meeting and narrowly avoiding a collision with the Delinquent Road Hazards gang, he challenges them to a race to which they agree. The console versions feature the full voice-over cast from the film, including the likes of Owen Wilson, Michael Keaton, Paul Newman, and Larry the Cable Guy. However in the PlayStation Portable and Nintendo DS versions, Lightning McQueen is instead voiced by Keith Ferguson. 

Ferguson also voices Lightning Mcqueen in the console versions, but only either when he's in monster form, or when he gets hit by something. The console and Microsoft Windows versions received positive reviews from critics, though the Game Boy Advance version met negative reception.

Gameplay
The console versions of the game are set in the fictional town of Radiator Springs, where it takes place after the movie. The player must compete in 19 road races, 8 mini-games, and 5 piston cup races to help Lightning McQueen  win his first Piston Cup. In the PSP version, the game presumably takes place on an alternate timeline. The player must compete in 13 races, as well as 5 boss races, to help Lightning McQueen claim Radiator Springs back from the Delinquent Road Hazards gang. The game takes place in a open world in the vein of Need for Speed, Grand Theft Auto and Midnight Club and features ten playable characters from the film (16 in the PSP version), all voiced by the original voice talent. The game also features a number of minigames and items for the player to collect.

Development 
On May 8, 2002, video game publisher THQ acquired the rights to the next three titles from Pixar Animation Studios – Finding Nemo, The Incredibles, and Cars. Cars was announced on February 7, 2006, and was later announced for Wii and Xbox 360. On June 6, 2006, THQ announced that the game would be shipping out for all platforms except Wii and Xbox 360. The Wii version was released on November 19 as a launch title for the console. The current-generation and 360 versions were developed by Rainbow Studios, while the Wii version was developed by Incinerator Games.

Reception

Cars received "generally positive" reviews. GameSpot gave 7.0 out of 10 for Xbox 360 and Wii versions, 7.6 out of 10 for the GameCube and Xbox versions, and 7.4 out of 10 for the PSP version. Metacritic gave 65 out of 100 for the Wii version, 54 out of 100 for the DS version, 73 out of 100 for the PC version, 71 out of 100 for the PlayStation 2 version, and 70 out of 100 for the PSP version.

The PlayStation 2 and Nintendo DS releases of Cars each received a "Platinum" sales award from the Entertainment and Leisure Software Publishers Association (ELSPA), indicating sales of at least 300,000 copies per version in the United Kingdom. In total, the game sold more than 8 million copies as of May 2007.

The GBA version was criticized as being "the worst version of the game" because of its incredibly short length, zoomed-in camera, a lack of a multiplayer mode, and a lack of any depth.

References

External links
 
 
 
 

2006 video games
Adventure games
Beenox games
Cars (franchise) video games
Disney video games
Game Boy Advance games
GameCube games
Nintendo DS games
Wii games
PlayStation 2 games
PlayStation Portable games
Xbox games
Xbox 360 games
Windows games
Multiplayer and single-player video games
Open-world video games
Racing video games
THQ games
Video games based on films
Video games developed in Canada
Video games set in Arizona
Wii Wheel games
Single-player video games
Video games using Havok
J2ME games
Video games developed in the United States
Rainbow Studios games